Baorisa is a genus of moths in the family Erebidae. It was long thought to be monotypic with the only species being Baorisa hieroglyphica.

Species
The genus currently contains four species:
Baorisa floresiana Behounek, Speidel and Thöny, 1996 (Flores)
Baorisa hieroglyphica Moore, 1882
Baorisa philippina Behounek, Speidel and Thöny, 1996 (Philippines)
Baorisa sulawesiana Behounek, Speidel and Thöny, 1996 (Sulawesi)

References

Calpinae